Marlagunta is a village in Dakkili mandal, located in the Nellore district of Andhra Pradesh, India.

Agriculture and weaving are the main source of income for people in this village.

As a part of development for the village and farmers of it, government recently made a passage of canal a water source coming from kandaleru dam.

The postal code (Pincode) for Marlagunta village is 524134.

References

Villages in Nellore district